Dave Hill (born 26 December 1952) is a Canadian middle-distance runner. He competed in the men's 1500 metres at the 1976 Summer Olympics.

References

1952 births
Living people
Athletes (track and field) at the 1976 Summer Olympics
Athletes (track and field) at the 1978 Commonwealth Games
Canadian male middle-distance runners
Olympic track and field athletes of Canada
Commonwealth Games competitors for Canada
Sportspeople from Trois-Rivières
20th-century Canadian people